The following is a list of Nigerien politicians, both past and present.



A
Abdoulaye, Souley
Adji, Boukary
Algabid, Hamid
Amadou, Hama

B
Bakary, Djibo
Bako, Mahamane Sani
Bazoum, Mohamed
Barkire Alidou

C
Cheiffou, Amadou
Cissé, Amadou
Courmo, Barcourgné

D
Diallo, Daouda
Diori, Hamani
Djermakoye, Moumouni Adamou
Djibo, Amadou Ali

H
Habibou, Allele Elhadj
Hama, Abdourahmane
Hamidou, Hassan
Hima, Mariama

I
Issoufou, Mahamadou
Issoufou, Oumarou Garba

K
Kané, Illa
Kountché, Seyni

M
Mahamidou, Aliou
Maidah, Mamadou
Maïnassara, Ibrahim Baré
Marafah, Ahmed
Mayaki, Adamou
Mayaki, Ibrahim Hassane
Mindaoudou, Aïchatou

O
Oumarou, Ide
Oumarou, Mamane
Ousmane, Mahamane
Moussa Hassane Abdou

S
Sabo, Boukary
Sabo, Nassirou
Saibou, Ali
Salifou, Amadou
Salifou, André
Sidikou, Abdou
Sidikou, Maman Sambo 
Sidikou, Oumarou

T
Tandja, Mamadou
Taya, Omar Katzelma

W
Wanké, Daouda Malam